Kamardhand is a village in Kohat District, Khyber Pakhtunkhwa, Pakistan.

References

Populated places in Kohat District